Javadiyeh-ye Mortazavi (also Romanized as Javādīyeh-ye Mortaz̤avī; also known as Javādīyeh) is a village in Ferdows Rural District, Ferdows District, Rafsanjan County, Kerman Province, Iran. At the 2006 census, its population was 364, in 92 families.

References 

Populated places in Rafsanjan County